Rosa pouzinii is a species of wild rose native to Mediterranean Europe. It is found in Spain, Portugal, southern France, parts of Italy, and the larger Western Mediterranean islands: Mallorca, Sardinia, Corsica and Sicily. There have been reports of occurrences in Greece (including Crete), but these may have been erroneous.

References

pouzinii